Sarah Elizabeth Martin Pitlyk (born 1977) is a United States district judge of the United States District Court for the Eastern District of Missouri.

Education 

Pitlyk earned her Bachelor of Arts, summa cum laude, from Boston College. She received Master of Arts degrees from both Georgetown University and KU Leuven (Belgium), where she studied as a Fulbright Scholar. Pitlyk earned her Juris Doctor from Yale Law School.

Legal career 
Upon graduation from law school, Pitlyk served as a law clerk to then-Judge Brett Kavanaugh of the United States Court of Appeals for the District of Columbia Circuit. She worked at Clark & Sauer LLC, a civil litigation firm in St. Louis, Missouri, and was an associate at Covington & Burling in Washington, D.C. She was special counsel at the Thomas More Society, where her practice focused on constitutional and civil rights litigation.

In 2018, Pitlyk supported Brett Kavanaugh, whom she had clerked for, during his Supreme Court nomination.

Federal judicial service 

On August 14, 2019, President Donald Trump announced his intent to nominate Pitlyk to serve as a United States district judge for the United States District Court for the Eastern District of Missouri. On September 9, 2019, her nomination was sent to the Senate. President Trump nominated Pitlyk to the seat vacated by Judge Catherine D. Perry, who assumed senior status on December 31, 2018.

On September 24, 2019, the American Bar Association (ABA) rated Pitlyk as "Not Qualified." The ABA said Pitlyk's rating was based on her lack of trial experience, as she had "never tried a case," she had "never examined a witness," she had "not taken a deposition," she had "not argued any motion in a state or federal trial court," she had "never picked a jury," and she had "never participated at any stage of a criminal matter." Pitlyk said one reason she had never tried a case and never taken a deposition is that she has been a member of legal teams that have allowed her to arrange her schedule in order to spend more time with her children.

On September 25, 2019, a hearing on her nomination was held before the Senate Judiciary Committee. At the hearing, Democratic Senator Dick Durbin expressed concerns about Pitlyk's lack of trial experience, and other Democratic Senators including Richard Blumenthal asked her about her anti-abortion views; she responded that her personal views would not affect her work as a judge. As a lawyer, Pitlyk had argued that frozen embryos from in vitro fertilisation should legally be considered human beings, and she wrote an amicus brief stating that "surrogacy has grave effects on society." On October 31, 2019, her nomination was reported out of committee by a 12–10 vote. 

On December 3, 2019, the United States Senate invoked cloture on her nomination by a 50–43 vote, with Maine senator Susan Collins voted against her nomination. On December 4, 2019, her nomination was confirmed by a 49–44 vote. She received her judicial commission on December 5, 2019, and was sworn into office on December 6, 2019.

Memberships 

She has been a member of the Federalist Society since 2006.

See also 
 Donald Trump Supreme Court candidates

References

External links 
 
 

1977 births
Living people
21st-century American lawyers
21st-century American judges
21st-century American women lawyers
21st-century American women judges
Boston College alumni
Federalist Society members
Georgetown University alumni
Judges of the United States District Court for the Eastern District of Missouri
KU Leuven alumni
Missouri lawyers
People associated with Covington & Burling
People from Indianapolis
United States district court judges appointed by Donald Trump
Yale Law School alumni